Dastgird or Dastgerd or Dastjerd or Dastjird, also rendered as Dast-i-Jird or Dasteh Jerd or Dashtgerd or Dashtgird, may refer to:

Chaharmahal and Bakhtiari Province
Dastgerd, Borujen, a village in Borujen County
Dastgerd, Kiar, a village in Kiar County
Dastgerd Rural District (Chaharmahal and Bakhtiari Province), in Kiar County
Dastgerd, Lordegan, a village in Lordegan County

East Azerbaijan Province
Dastjerd, Azarshahr, a village in Azarshahr County
Dastjerd, Meyaneh, a village in Meyaneh County
Dastjerd, Varzaqan, a village in Varzaqan County
Dastjerd Rural District (East Azerbaijan Province), in Azarshahr County

Fars Province
Dastjerd, Estahban, a village in Estahban County
Dastjerd, Khorrambid, a village in Khorrambid County

Hamadan Province
Dastjerd, Bahar, a village in Bahar County
Dastjerd, Kabudarahang, a village in Kabudarahang County

Hormozgan Province
Dastgerd-e Dargaz, a village in Bashagard County
Dastgerd-e Nagerd, a village in Bashagard County

Isfahan Province
Dastjerd, Ardestan, a village in Ardestan County
Dastgerd, a city in Borkhar County
Dastgerd, Fereydunshahr, a village in Fereydunshahr County
Dastjerd, Isfahan, a village in Isfahan County
Dastgerd, Isfahan, a village in Isfahan County
Dastgerd, alternate name of Dastgerdu, a village in Isfahan County
Dastgerd-e Mar, a village in Isfahan County
Dastgerd, Mobarakeh, a village in Mobarakeh County
Dastjerd, Natanz, a village in Natanz County

Kerman Province
Dastjerd, Bardsir, a village in Bardsir County
Dastjerd, Kerman, a village in Kerman County
Dastjerd, Ravar, a village in Ravar County

Kermanshah Province
Dastjerd-e Olya, Kermanshah, a village in Sahneh County
Dastjerd-e Sofla, Kermanshah, a village in Sahneh County

Kohgiluyeh and Boyer-Ahmad Province
Dastgerd, Kohgiluyeh, a village in Kohgiluyeh County
Dastgerd, Charusa, a village in Kohgiluyeh County

Lorestan Province
Dastgerd, Besharat, a village in Besharat District, Aligudarz County
Dastgerd, Zaz va Mahru, a village in Zaz va Mahru District, Aligudarz County

Markazi Province
Dastjerd, Ashtian, a village in Ashtian County
Dastjerd, Shazand, a village in Shazand County

North Khorasan Province
Dastjerd, North Khorasan, a village in North Khorasan Province, Iran

Qazvin Province
Dastjerd, Qazvin, a village in Qazvin Province, Iran
Dastjerd-e Olya, a village in Qazvin Province, Iran
Dastjerd-e Sofla, Qazvin, a village in Qazvin Province, Iran
Dastjerd Rural District (Qazvin Province), in Qazvin County, Qazvin Province, Iran

Qom Province
Dastjerd, a city in Qom County, Qom Province, Iran
Dastgerd, Qom, a village in Qom County, Qom Province, Iran
Dastjerd Rural District (Qom Province), in Qom County, Qom Province, Iran

Razavi Khorasan Province
Dastgerd, Razavi Khorasan, a village in Chenaran County
Dastjerd, Firuzeh, a village in Firuzeh County
Dastjerd-e Aqa Bozorg, a village in Mashhad County
Dastjerd, Rashtkhvar, a village in Rashtkhvar County

Semnan Province
Dastjerd, Semnan, a village in Shahrud County

South Khorasan Province
Dastgerd, Birjand, a village in Birjand County
Dastgerd, Darmian, a village in Darmian County
Dastgerd, Khusf, a village in Khusf County
Dastjerd, Qaen, a village in Qaen County
Dastgerd, Sarbisheh, a village in Sarbisheh County
Dastgerd, Mud, a village in Sarbisheh County

West Azerbaijan Province
Dastjerd, West Azerbaijan, a village in Urmia County
Dastjerd-e Abbasabad, a village in Urmia County

Yazd Province
Dastjerd, Yazd, a village in Taft County

See also
Dastgerdan (disambiguation)
Dastagird, Sassanian city near Ctesiphon